Akira Asahara (浅原晃) is a Japanese Magic: The Gathering player. His successes include two Pro Tour top eights, two Grand Prix wins, and eight other Grand Prix top eights. He has been referred to as a rogue deck designer.

Achievements

In 2010, Akira Asahara qualified for an invitation to the 2010 Magic Online World Championships. Asahara (known as Archer on Magic Online) reached the finals of the twelve man tournament, facing Carlos Romão.  He lost the match 1–2, coming second in the tournament but still winning a $17,000 prize.

References

Japanese Magic: The Gathering players
People from Sagamihara
Year of birth missing (living people)
Living people